Number One Riverside is a multi-use public building in Rochdale, Greater Manchester, England. It incorporates Rochdale Metropolitan Borough Council civic offices and customer service centre, Rochdale Central Library as well as conference facilities for community use and office space for third parties. The publicly accessible ground floor has restaurant and café spaces overlooking the River Roch. It was designed by FaulknerBrowns Architects and opened to the public in March 2013.

The contemporary building was designed to be energy efficient and incorporates renewable and low carbon technology including a biomass boiler, photo voltaic panels to generate electricity and solar panels to help heat water. Its green roof was designed to harvest rainwater and provide insulation.

It replaced the municipal offices (that were known locally as 'The Black Box'), which were demolished in 2014 along with the bus station and multi-storey car park to make way for the Rochdale Riverside retail and leisure development.

References

Notes

External links

Buildings and structures in Rochdale